Phạm Minh Tuấn (born 19 October 1993) is a Vietnamese tennis player.

Phạm represents Vietnam at the Davis Cup where he has a W/L record of 3–6.

External links

1993 births
Living people
Vietnamese male tennis players
People from Da Nang
Tennis players at the 2018 Asian Games
Asian Games competitors for Vietnam
Competitors at the 2021 Southeast Asian Games
Southeast Asian Games bronze medalists for Vietnam
Southeast Asian Games medalists in tennis